Tieles is a surname. Notable people with the surname include:

Cecilio Tieles (born 1942), Cuban pianist, professor and musicologist
Evelio Tieles (born 1941), Cuban violinist and professor